Teor was a comune (municipality) in the Province of Udine in the Italian region Friuli-Venezia Giulia, located about  northwest of Trieste and about  southwest of Udine.

Teor bordered the following municipalities: Palazzolo dello Stella, Pocenia, Rivignano, Ronchis.

Since January 1, 2014 Teor has been merged with Rivignano, forming a new municipality called Rivignano Teor.

Demographic evolution

Notable people
 Birthplace of 1982 FIFA World Cup champion Fulvio Collovati.

References

External links
 www.comune.teor.ud.it/

Cities and towns in Friuli-Venezia Giulia